"Sole Survivor" is a song and a single made by the German power metal band Helloween taken from the album Master of the Rings. On "Closer to Home", the lead vocals are sung by Roland Grapow. The song has been covered by the Swedish power metal band Dragonland on their third album 'Starfall'.

This single was released only in Japan.

Single track listing

Personnel
Andi Deris - vocals
Roland Grapow - rhythm and lead guitars / lead vocals in "Closer to Home"
Michael Weikath - lead and rhythm guitars
Markus Grosskopf - bass guitar
Uli Kusch - drums

References

1994 songs
1995 singles
Helloween songs
Songs written by Andi Deris